Alice Parisi (born 11 December 1990) is an Italian football midfielder, currently playing for Italian Serie A club Fiorentina. She previously played for ACF Trento, ASD Bardolino, UPC Tavagnacco and Sassuolo.

She has been a member of the Italian national team. She played her first match with the senior team in July 2007 against Mexico. The following year she was a member of the Under-19 team that won 2008 U-19 European Championship, where she scored the decisive goal in the final.

She subsequently took part in the 2009 European Championship qualifying and final tournament. Consolidating her place in the team throughout the 2011 World Cup qualifying and began the 2013 European Championship qualifying as a starter.

Titles
 2008 UEFA Women's Under-19 Championship
 2 Serie A (2009, 2017)
 4 Coppa Italia (2013, 2014, 2017, 2018)
 2 Supercoppa Italiana (2008, 2018)

References

External links 

1990 births
Living people
Italian women's footballers
Italy women's international footballers
Serie A (women's football) players
A.S.D. AGSM Verona F.C. players
Sportspeople from Trentino
Women's association football midfielders
U.P.C. Tavagnacco players
Fiorentina Women's F.C. players
2019 FIFA Women's World Cup players
Footballers from Trentino-Alto Adige/Südtirol